40 Commando RM is a battalion-sized formation of the British Royal Marines and subordinate unit within 3 Commando Brigade, the principal Commando formation, under the Operational Command of Commander in Chief Fleet. Their barracks are at Norton Manor Camp, Norton Fitzwarren near Taunton in Somerset.

Tasked as a Commando light infantry unit, 40 Commando (pronounced "Forty Commando") is capable of a wide range of operational tasks. Personnel regularly deploy outside the United Kingdom on operations or training. Whilst 3 Commando Brigade RM are the principal cold weather warfare formation, personnel are capable of operating in a variety of theatres including tropical jungle, desert or mountainous terrain. The Commando is a regular participant in the annual Brigade cold weather warfare exercise in Norway. The unit's first "winter" was 1991, until which the unit was nicknamed the "Sunshine Commando".

All personnel will have completed the Commando course at the Commando Training Centre (CTCRM) at Lympstone in Devon, entitling them to wear the green beret, with attached personnel having completed the All Arms Commando Course.

History

Formation
Early Commando units were all from the British Army but by February 1942, the Royal Marines were asked to organise Commando units of their own, and 6,000 men volunteered.  The first Royal Marines commando unit was formed at Deal in Kent on 14 February 1942 and designated 'The Royal Marine Commando'. Before long it was re-designated RM 'A' Commando. Col J Picton Phillips was the Commanding Officer.

Dieppe Raid
The Commando's first assignment was at Dieppe on 19 August 1942. In support of the main Canadian assault force, Nos. 3 and 4 (Army) Commandos were to destroy the enemy coastal batteries covering the main landing beaches, whilst No. 40 had selected tasks in the port area and was to be responsible for reinforcements as required. In the pre-dawn run-in the landing craft of No. 3 were fired upon and scattered with the result that only two small parties managed to land, one was overwhelmed, but the other successfully engaged the Berneval battery for some hours before withdrawing. On the other flank at Varengeville No. 4, under the command of Lord Lovat, carried out what was officially hailed as a 'classic operation of war' and completely destroyed the Hess Battery, successfully withdrawing and re-embarking with prisoners. Unfortunately, No. 40, when committed to their landing, under well-nigh impossible conditions, suffered severe casualties. Of the 370 officers and men, 76 were lost on the beaches. Among those killed was the Commanding officer (CO), while the second-in-command, Robert Houghton was captured.

Italy and the Aegean
On return RM 'A' Commando was again re-designated; this time as 40 (RM) Commando. Further training and replenishment was carried out. Once back to full strength it was sent to Sicily in July 1943 and a little later in September saw action at Pizzio. Later that year the Commando was in action in Termoli in October, and in 1944 was embroiled at Anzio. Later service in Yugoslavia and Albania followed by policing duties on Corfu wound up 40's wartime activities.

Post-Second World War
Following the Second World War, 2 Commando (Nos. 2, 9, 40(RM) and 43(RM)) disbanded leaving 3 Commando Brigade (42(RM), 44(RM) and 45(RM)). To recognise 2 Commando Brigade one of the Commandos was renamed, No44(RM) becoming No40(RM).

The Commando was involved in 1947–1948 Civil War in Palestine acting as the rearguard in the Protectorate, leaving in 1948. It also fought in the Malayan Emergency against the communist Malayan National Liberation Army.

Malayan Emergency - headhunting photographs 

Members of the 40 Commandos caused a media scandal when photographs were leaked to the public showing their marines posing with the decapitated heads of pro-independence guerrillas during the Malayan Emergency. This was a common practice employed by the British during the war and was often conducted by Iban headhunters from Borneo hired by the British military.

In April 1952, British left-wing newspaper The Daily Worker (today known as the Morning Star) published a photograph depicting soldiers inside a 40 Commando base near Kuala Kangsar holding the decapitated head of a suspected pro independence fighter belonging to the Malayan National Liberation Army (MNLA). An Admiralty spokesman subsequently claimed that the photographs were a forgery and a "communist trick", though Colonial Secretary Oliver Lyttelton later confirmed to Parliament that they were genuine. Lyttelton came to the defence of the Commando, noting that the decapitations had been conducted by the an Iban headhunter from Borneo hired by the British army, and not the Marines themselves.

1960s
The Commando subsequently undertook security duties in Cyprus, Hong Kong and Egypt before moving to Singapore in 1961. It was involved in operations during the confrontation with Indonesia (Borneo) throughout the following decade.

Return to UK
In 1971 the Commando left Singapore and re-established itself in Seaton Barracks, Crownhill, Plymouth. Over the next decade the Commando found itself deployed to Northern Ireland four times and also undertook an unexpected two-month tour in Cyprus after the 1974 invasion by the Turkish Army.

Falklands Conflict
In 1982, following the Argentine invasion of the Falkland Islands, the Commando deployed on Operation Corporate. On 21 May the Commando were among the first troops ashore and secured the beachhead at San Carlos. The Unit was subsequently split having two companies attached to the Welsh Guards, preparing to attack Port Stanley, when the Argentine surrender came.

1980s
On their return from the Falklands, the Commando spent the rest of the decade involved in a variety of tasks including two Northern Ireland tours to South Armagh, a six-month Peace-Keeping tour in Cyprus and a six-month operational tour in Belize. During the tour in Cyprus, the Commando was awarded the Wilkinson Sword of Peace for the third time. Also during this period, in 1983, the Commando relocated to Norton Manor Camp near Taunton.

1990s
In 1991 the Unit undertook its first Norway deployment but found itself undergoing a dramatic climatic change when, due to the Gulf War, it deployed to Northern Iraq to ensure the security of Kurdish refugees. Northern Ireland tours, Norway winter deployments and a major Asia-Pacific Exercise kept the Commando busy through the following years. In November 1993 the unit deployed to West Belfast in support of the Royal Ulster Constabulary (RUC), returning in May 1994. In 1998 a substantial part of the Commando deployed to the Congo to ensure the safe evacuation of UK nationals from Kinshasa City.

Recent history

The new millennium saw the Commando deploy to Northern Ireland and on their return they were the first Commando to reorganise under a new structural concept called Commando 21.

The Unit deployed in its entirety in January 2003, initially part of the Naval Task Group (NTG) 03 in HMS Ocean, HMS Ark Royal and Royal Fleet Auxiliary ships RFA Sir Galahad and RFA Sir Tristram. The group sailed through the Mediterranean Sea, after a brief stop at Cyprus, continuing through the Suez Canal bound for the Persian Gulf. The United Nations were engaged in diplomatic efforts to avoid the need for military intervention in Iraq, as the Unit was busy rehearsing in the United Arab Emirates and Kuwait for possible operations against Iraq.

In March 2003 a coalition force, under the overall command of the United States, entered Iraq. During Operation TELIC 1, the liberation of Iraq, on the night of 20 March 2003, 40 Commando RM, under the command of Lt Col G K Messenger DSO OBE, mounted an amphibious helicopter assault to seize key Iraqi oil infrastructure on the Al-Faw Peninsula. As the first conventional troops on the ground, the strategic significance of the operation was immense and, as the Divisional Main Effort, the assault was supported by a vast array of coalition firepower. The Commando Group's role in the success of the coalition operation in Iraq was pivotal and profound. In a two-week period of intense operations, it secured key oil infrastructure, cleared a large expanse of enemy held terrain, and defeated a major enemy stronghold on the periphery of Basra, killing over 150 Iraqi soldiers and taking 440 prisoners.

In 2004 the Unit returned to Iraq as part of a multi-national division peace-support operation. The commandos returned in April 2008 from a tour in the Helmand Province of Afghanistan as part of Operation Herrick. During the tour L-Cpl Matthew Croucher was awarded the George Cross for his action of jumping on a live grenade during a patrol.

40 Cdo returned to Afghanistan in 2010 for Op Herrick 12. They were the last British troops to leave Sangin, described as the "deadliest place in Afghanistan", after command was handed over to the US Armed Forces.

A Company deployed with the UK Response Force Task Group in April 2011. Additional follow up forces were on board RFA Cardigan Bay. They then completed Exercise Red Alligator in October 2013: this trained their skills for the role of the Lead Commando Group.

In the autumn of 2017, the Unit spearheaded the UK Military's crisis response (Operation RUMAN) in the Caribbean following the catastrophic damage caused to UK Overseas Territories by record-breaking Atlantic Hurricanes. 40 Commando deployed hundreds of troops to the British Virgin Islands, the Turks and Caicos Islands and Anguilla. Their efforts helped to reassure the affected communities, restore security, fix critical infrastructure and distribute humanitarian aid.

40 Commando are CBRN defense experts, expecting to be the lead unit in the event of a CBRN incident. In 2018 they participated in the annual chemical warfare exercise, Exercise TOXIC DAGGER, on Salisbury Plain involving over 300 military personnel, along with the RAF Regiment, the Royal Marines Band Service for casualty treatment and utilising Defence CBRN Centre expertise.

It became clear in 2018 that 40 Commando would, as would 45 Commando, form the infantry component of a Littoral Response Group, as part of restructuring in the Future Commando Force programme.

Unit memorable dates
The Landing at Termoli — 3 October 1943
The Landing at San Carlos — 21 May 1982
The Clearance of the Al-Faw Peninsula — 20 March 2003

Battle honours
The following Battle honours were awarded to the British Commandos during the Second World War.

Adriatic
Alethangyaw
Aller
Anzio
Argenta Gap
Burma 1943–45
Crete
Dieppe
Dives Crossing
Djebel Choucha
Flushing
Greece 1944–45
Italy 1943–45
Kangaw
Landing at Porto San Venere
Landing in Sicily
Leese
Litani
Madagascar
Middle East 1941, 1942, 1944
Monte Ornito
Myebon
Normandy Landing
North Africa 1941–43
North-West Europe 1942, 1944–1945
Norway 1941
Pursuit to Messina
Rhine
St. Nazaire
Salerno
Sedjenane 1
Sicily 1943
Steamroller Farm
Syria 1941
Termoli
Vaagso
Valli di Comacchio
Westkapelle

Commanding officers

Commanders have included:
1942–1942 Lt Col J Picton Phillips RM (KIA Dieppe)
1942–1944 Lt Col J C "Pops" Manners RM (KIA Brač, Yugoslavia)
1944–1944 Major N S E Maude RM 
1944–1945 Lt Col R W Sankey DSO DSC RM
1945–1945 Maj I D De'Ath DSO MBE RM
1945–1945 Lt Col C L Price RM
1947–1949 Lt Col R D Houghton OBE MC RM
1949–1951 Lt Col B J D Lumsden RM 
1951–1953 Lt Col M Price DSO OBE RM
1953–1954 Lt Col H E Johns MBE RM
1954–1956 Lt Col T M Gray DSO MC RM
1956–1958 Lt Col D G Tweed DSO MBE RM
1958–1959 Lt Col Peter Hellings DSO MC RM
1959–1961 Lt Col I S Harrison RM
1961–1963 Lt Col David Hunter MC RM
1963–1964 Lt Col J F Parsons MC RM
1964–1966 Lt Col J A Taplin MBE RM
1966–1967 Lt Col E D Pounds RM
1967–1969 Lt Col Robert Loudoun RM
1969–1970 Lt Col David Alexander RM
1970-1972 Lt Col D L Bailey OBE RM
1972–1974 Lt Col John Mottram RM
1975–1978 Lt Col Julian Thompson RM
1978–1979 Lt Col Martin Garrod RM
1979–1981 Lt Col Robin Ross RM
1981–1983 Lt Col Malcolm Hunt RM
1983–1985 Lt Col Tim Donkin RM
1985-1987  Lt Col Alan Hooper RM
1987–1989 Lt Col John Chester RM
1989–1991 Lt Col A D Wray RM
1991–1992 Lt Col Graham Dunlop RM
1992–1994 Lt Col Anthony Milton RM
1994–1996 Lt Col Ian Gardiner RM
1996–1998 Lt Col Jim Dutton RM
1998–2000 Lt Col John Rose OBE RM
2000–2002 Lt Col David Capewell RM
2002–2003 Lt Col Gordon Messenger DSO OBE ADC
2003–2004 Lt Col Richard Watts OBE RM
2004–2006 Lt Col D C M King RM
2006–2008 Lt Col S M Birrell DSO RM
2008–2010 Lt Col Paul James DSO RM
2011–2013 Lt Col Matt Jackson DSO RM
2013–2015 Lt Col Alex Janzen OBE RM
2015–2017 Lt Col Andy Watkins RM
2017–2019 Lt Col Paul Maynard OBE RM
2019–2021 Lt Col Simon Rogers RM
2021–Present Lt Col Andy Dow RM

References
Notes

Bibliography

External links

 40 Commando - Royal Navy official website
 40 Commando Association

Royal Marine formations and units
Military units and formations established in 1942
Military units and formations of the United Kingdom in the Falklands War
Military units and formations of the United Kingdom in the War in Afghanistan (2001–2021)
Commandos (United Kingdom)
Organisations based in Somerset
1942 establishments in the United Kingdom